The men's 15 km mass start biathlon competition of the Pyeongchang 2018 Olympics was held on 18 February 2018 at the Alpensia Biathlon Centre in Pyeongchang, South Korea.

Qualification

Schedule
All times are (UTC+9).

Results
The race started at 20:15.

References

Mass start